Girasole is a comune (municipality) in the Province of Nuoro in the Italian region Sardinia, located about  northeast of Cagliari and about  northwest of Tortolì.

Girasole borders the following municipalities: Lotzorai, Tortolì, and Villagrande Strisaili.

References

Cities and towns in Sardinia